News18 Assam North East  is a 24-hour satellite channel of Assam, based in Guwahati, Assam. The channel focuses Assam and other North Eastern states of India, and tagged as News 18 Assam North East. This channel is owned by Network 18 group. It covers regional as well as national and international news and various other shows in Assamese and English. The channel was launched on 24 June 2016.

Broadcast programs

 Dintur Xirunam
 Xandhiyar Xirso Xambad
 Ekhontek
 Tirthayatra
 Dintur Bixoi
 Rising Sports Shining Northeast
 Xipa
 Cinema 18
 Gaon Sohor Zilar Khobor
 Bixes 30 Minute
 Druto Xongbaad

See also 
 CNN-News18
 List of Assamese-language television channels

References

External links
News 18
News 18 Assam Live Watch / Streaming

Television stations in Guwahati
24-hour television news channels in India
Assamese-language mass media
Assamese-language television channels
Television channels and stations established in 2014
Mass media in Assam